Star of the Sea College is an independent, Catholic, day school for girls, located in Brighton, an inner south-eastern suburb of Melbourne, Victoria, Australia.

Established in 1883 by the Presentation Sisters, the college has a non-selective enrolment policy, and currently caters for approximately 1,000 female students from Years 7 to 12.

Star of the Sea is affiliated with the Association of Heads of Independent Schools of Australia (AHISA), the Alliance of Girls' Schools Australasia (AGSA), and is a founding member of Girls Sport Victoria (GSV).

History
Star of the Sea College was founded by the Presentation Sisters in March 1883. The Sisters were asked to come to Australia from Ireland by Father James Corbett, and after establishing the first Presentation Convent and school in Victoria at Windsor (now Presentation College Windsor), they moved to Gardenvale (then known as Elsternwick). The Presentation Sisters from Wagga Wagga in New South Wales, established Star of the Sea College.

The foundresses, Mother John Byrne and Mother Paul Fay, named the school after Our Lady, 'Star of the Sea' when they moved into a house called "Turret Lodge", which had a clear view of a local bay.

Principals

House system
The school has four houses through which students engage in inter-house competition and other activities. The house system dates back to the 1930s, when principal Mother Angela Johnston formed Nagle (blue), named after founder of the Presentation Sisters Nano Nagle, and Stella (red), named for the Latin word for "star". Two additional houses were created in 1948: Ave (yellow) draws its name from the Latin word (in reference to "Ave Maria"), and Fay (green) is named for one of the school's two founders, Mother Paul Fay. Each house has its own crest which symbolises the spirit of the house. From years 10 to 12 students participate in a vertical homeroom system in which students from the same house are group together to encourage house spirit.

Sport 
Star of the Sea is a member of Girls Sport Victoria (GSV).

GSV premierships 
Star of the Sea has won the following GSV premierships.

 Athletics (8) - 2001, 2002, 2003, 2004, 2005, 2006, 2007, 2008
 Basketball (2) - 2002, 2010
 Cricket (5) - 2004, 2005, 2006, 2007, 2012
 Football - 2010
 Netball (8) - 2005, 2006, 2009, 2010, 2012, 2013, 2014, 2018
 Soccer (6) - 2001, 2003, 2004, 2007, 2008, 2019
 Soccer, 5 a Side (2) - 2015, 2016
 Softball (3) - 2001, 2006, 2007
 Tennis - 2019
 Volleyball (3) - 2008, 2011, 2016

ANZAC

Named for the Australian war veterans once housed there, ANZAC is Star of the Sea's Year 9 campus. Located in the Kamesburgh Gardens on North Road, Brighton, the forty-room mansion was built in 1874 and presented as a gift to the Repatriation Department in 1919. It served for a time as ANZAC Hostel before the aged care home relocated to an updated facility in 1996. The mansion was then leased by the college, and opened as a Year 9 campus in 1997.

ANZAC retains a close relationship with the hostel, participating in Remembrance Day ceremonies and a "Companions Program" which allows students to engage in weekly visits with the hostel's residents.

The campus has its own system of four houses, each of which are named after well-known battles or military campaigns fought by Australian soldiers: Kokoda, Gallipoli, Long Tan and Tobruk.

Stacella
Stacella is the name of the college's a cappella choir.  Founded in 1996, Stacella is composed of over 120 students from years 7 to 12, and has performed for primary schools, nursing homes, local festivals, service organisations and corporate clients. The choir holds an annual concert, in which all students perform the repertoire they have learnt during the year. As well as five tours to New Zealand and a trip Fiji, to date, the choir has also released five CDs.

Student-exchange programs
The school has a student exchange program for German, Italian and Japanese students. Every year girls who are learning a language in the senior years get the opportunity to be part of the student exchange program. Students in years 10 and 11 also are able to go on a study tour to either Italy or Japan.

Notable alumnae 

Nicky Buckley – Model and long-serving Sale of the Century hostess
Dame Carmen Thérèse Callil – Critic and Writer; Founder of Virago Press (finished schooling at Loreto Mandeville Hall)
Kaye Darveniza – Victorian Parliamentary Secretary for Regional and Rural Development; Member of the Legislative Council (ALP) for Northern Victoria Region (also attended Shepparton High School)
Mary Louise Easson – Company Director; Managing Director of Probity International; Former Member (ALP) of the House of Representatives for the Division of Lowe (NSW); Recipient of the Centenary Medal 2003
Sarah Fitz-Gerald AM – Consultant Coach at the Victorian Institute of Sport; Professional Squash Player (1987–2002), Career titles include: Commonwealth Games (Manchester) Gold Medal; World Open 2002, 2001, 1998, 1997 & 1996; Australian Open 2003, 2002, 2001 and 1997; Commonwealth Games (Kuala Lumpur) Silver & Bronze Medal (also attended MacGregor State High School)
Anna Funder – Author
Ellia Green – Australian rugby union player
 Germaine Greer – Feminist academic and journalist
Rachel Griffiths – Actress
Gina Liano – Barrister and television personality (known for The Real Housewives of Melbourne)
Elizabeth Miller – Australian state politician
Caitlin Stasey – Actress
Holly Valance – Actress and singer
G Flip – Musician, singer, songwriter, producer and drummer
Elle Bennetts – Australian rules footballer and netballer

See also 
 List of schools in Victoria
 Victorian Certificate of Education

References

External links
Star of the Sea College website

Girls' schools in Victoria (Australia)
Catholic secondary schools in Melbourne
Presentation Sisters schools
Educational institutions established in 1883
1883 establishments in Australia
Convents in Australia
Buildings and structures in the City of Bayside